The Canon EOS M50 Mark II, also known as the EOS Kiss M2 in Japan, is a 24.1 megapixels entry-mid-level Mirrorless interchangeable-lens camera announced by Canon on October 14, 2020. 
As a part of their Mirrorless Canon EOS M Line, it is the successor to the Canon EOS M50, sitting above the entry-level Canon EOS M200 and below the enthusiast-oriented Canon EOS M6 Mark II

Features 

 24.1 effective megapixel APS-C CMOS sensor
 DIGIC 8 image processor with 14-bit processing
 Dual Pixel Auto-Focus (except 4K video mode - only Contrast Detect auto-focus).
 ISO 100 – 25,600, expandable up to 51,200.
 2.36-million dot OLED built-in electronic viewfinder (EVF).
 1080p Full HD video recording at 24p, 25p, 30p and 60p.
 4K video (UHD) video recording at 23.98 fps or 25 fps (PAL / NTSC), although without the Dual-pixel AF (only simple Contrast Detect AF) and 4K mode is limited to a 1.6x Crop factor of the APS-C Crop-sized sensor and limited to 24p with no option for 25 or 30 or 60p.
 10 frames per second continuous shooting, 7.4 with AF. 
 3.2" vari-angle LCD touchscreen with 1,6m dots resolution.
 3.5 mm microphone jack for external microphones
 Bluetooth (NFC dropped from the MK II)

New Features to the M50 Mark II 
Over the M50 it replaces, the new features include:

 Improved autofocus including eye autofocus for stills and video.
 Vertical video shooting support.
 Newly added tap video record button and movie self-timer on the LCD touchscreen for better Vlogging experience
 High quality webcam capability, with the free EOS Webcam Utility software or Clean HDMI output
 Wireless YouTube Live Streaming capability
 The ability to tap the screen to auto focus on your subject while looking through the EVF, helping to control who the main focus of the image is.  
 250 shots CIPA rated battery life versus 235 shots on the previous model.
 NFC is dropped from the MK II compared to the previous M50 that had it.

The rest of the camera is identical to the M50 it replaces, including the physical body, internal & external component, and all the features/capabilities of the camera, thus the M50 Mark II is a mild refresh to the already successful camera.

References

External links 
 https://in.canon/en/consumer/eos-m50-mark-ii-ef-m15-45mm-f-3-5-6-3-is-stm/product

Canon digital cameras